Xie Shang (308– 14 June 357), courtesy name Renzu, was a military general, musician and writer of the Jin dynasty (266–420). He was a member of the Xie clan of Chen Commandery and was the elder cousin to the Jin prime minister Xie An. In the 350s, he participated in the expeditions to reclaim northern China for the Jin dynasty, his most important contribution being his recovery of the imperial seal, which had been lost in the north decades prior. Although a general, Shang was mostly known for his talents in art and music. He was one of the earlier known players of the pipa and helped popularize bells and stone chimes in southern China.

Life and career

Early life and career 
Xie Shang was born in Chen Commandery in 308 as the son of the Prefect of Yuzhang  (豫章; around present-day Nanchang, Jiangxi), Xie Kun. His brother died when he was only seven years old, while his father died when he was around ten years old. On both of their funerals, he displayed maturity which puzzled the guests and captured their attention. At his brother's funeral, he was told by his father to seat with the guests. One of the guests openly remarked "This child is a Yan Hui in the seats," but Xie Shang rebuked, "How can you tell a Yan Hui without a Zhongni in the seats?" On his father's funeral in early 324, the Jin official Wen Jiao came and visit him to console him. Wen thought that Shang's mourning was excessive for a child of his age, and he saw great potential in him because of this.

By the time he reached adulthood, Xie Shang was known for his intelligence and wits. He avoided vulgar acts, his worst instance only being that he loved wearing flashy clothes and pants which he later stopped after his uncles advised him to. The Prime Minister, Wang Dao, favoured him a lot as he reminded him of his relative Wang Rong, one of the Seven Sages of the Bamboo Groves. Because of this, Wang would call him "Little Anfeng (小安豐)" (Anfeng refers to Wang Rong's place of peerage). Once he was old enough, Shang inherited his father's title of Marquis of Xian. In the government, Xie Shang served a number of offices in the government and kept those offices for the rest of his life.

Shang would often visit the General Who Maintains the West, Yu Yi at Wuchang to discuss with him about military affairs. One time, the two were practicing archery when Yu said to Shang, "If you hit the target, I shall vouch for you a promotion." Shang drew his bow and managed to get a bullseye, so Yu did just as he promised. Shang was simple and incorruptible in his governance. His soldiers built a dark-clothed tent made from 40 pieces of cloth. Shang had it torn down and distributed the cloth among his men. In 344, Xie Shang became General of the Household Gentlemen of the South. Around the same time, Yu Yi's influential brother, Yu Bing, died and there were considerations to have Xie Shang replace him to diminish the Yu clan's power. However, Yu Yi knew of this and intervened, so Shang retained his old positions.

Northern expeditions 
In 352, the Jin Grand Marshal, Yin Hao was petitioned to lead a campaign to reclaim Luoyang and Xuchang in northern China. Yin Hao had Xie Shang and Xun Xian to serve as his generals during the campaign. The warlord in Xuchang, Zhang Yu (張遇), had previously surrendered to Jin. Xie was tasked in appeasing him but failed. As a result, Zhang Yu lost confidence in Jin and rebelled, seizing Xuchang and Luoyang for himself.

Around the same time, the Qiang chieftain, Yao Xiang had arrived in Jin from the recently destroyed Later Zhao state. He submitted to Jin and began immediately serving in the northern expedition by being stationed at Qiao (譙; present-day Bozhou, Anhui). Xiang rode on his horse and crossed the Huai River to visit Xie Shang at Shouchun. Shang sent away his attendants and guards as he wanted to personally meet with Yao Xiang, who he knew for his fame. Shang recognized him even when he wore a common headscarf, and the two talked with one another like old friends.

The Heavenly King of Ran Wei, Ran Min was captured by Former Yan forces later in 352. His general Jiang Gan (蔣幹), who was ordered to defend Ye before Min's death, was on the verge of defeat as Yan forces placed the city under siege. He submitted to Jin and asked Xie Shang to help him, so Xie sent his general Dai Shi (戴施) to save him at Ye. During the course of the defence, Dai managed to trick Jiang into giving him the imperial seal, and kept it at his camp in Fangtou (枋頭, in modern Hebi, Henan).

Meanwhile, Xie Shang and Yao Xiang attacked Zhang Yu at Xuchang, so Zhang was offered reinforcements by Former Qin forces led by Fu Xiong. Xie fought the Qin at Chengqiao  (誠橋; near Xuchang) along the Ying River where he was badly routed and lost 15,000 soldiers. Shang fled to Huainan while Yao Xiang abandoned his baggages to escort him. Shang's defeat prompted Yin Hao to retreat back to Shouchun, and Shang was demoted to General Who Establishes Might. Later on, Shang returned the imperial seal which Dai Shi recovered to the Jin court, and he was greatly congratulated by the officials.

Xie Shang attacked Xuchang again after returning the seal. This time he sent his Champion General Wang Xia (王俠) to capture and Wang drove out Former Qin's Inspector of Yuzhou out from the city. Shang was promoted to Official Who Concurrently Serves in the Palace and camped at Shitou. For the next few years, Xie remained on the defensive and was given new important positions each year. When Yao Xiang rebelled in 353, Shang was stationed south of the Huai river, as the court hoped that their friendship may result in Xiang returning to Jin, although this did not happen during the two's remaining lifetime.

Illness and death 
In 356, Huan Wen captured Luoyang and had a petition to have Xie Shang guard Luoyang. However, Shang was greatly sick at the start of 357, so the Intendant of Danyang, Wang Huzhi (王胡之), took his place while Shang was summoned to Jiankang to be made Guard General and Cavalier In Regular Attendance. However, before he could arrive, Shang succumbed to his illness and died. The court posthumously gave him his intended offices along with the privilege of a Separate Office with equal ceremonial to the Three Excellencies and posthumously named him "Jian (简)".

Art and Literary works 
Although Xie Shang had been a general for most of his career, his talents mostly laid in arts and literary works. When Xie Shang went to meet with Wang Dao to receive his first office, Wang was about to hold an event at his mansion. Wang asked Shang, "I heard that you know "Quyuwu (鴝鵒舞)". The guests are all eager to see the style. I wonder if you can fulfill their wishes?" Shang agreed. He put on his clothes and began dancing. Wang and the guests were impressed with his techniques and applauded him at the festival.

Shang was also talented at playing instruments, his most notable one being the pipa as he was one of the earlier players to use such instrument. It was said that Shang could perform the pipa with his legs raised. Apart from the pipa, he played the Guzheng, and once performed it in front of Huan Wen who requested it. While he was guarding Shouchun in around 353, Shang gathered the local musicians to play stone chimes in the court. The people greatly enjoyed them, and it was said because of Xie Shang that bells and stone chimes became popular among southern Chinese.

Other than that, Shang was skilled at cursive script, although none of his works had survived. The famous Song dynasty calligrapher, Su Shi had mentioned them in his "Dongpo Inscription (東坡題跋)". The Book of Sui compiled ten of his poems in the "Xie Shang Ji (謝尚集)" but only five survived through the Tang dynasty and none of them exists today. His only known work that fully survived to this day is a short poem he titled "Song of the Great Dao (大道曲)". Other that exists as snippets are "Poems for Wang Biaozhi (贈王彪之詩)" and "Song of the Zheng (箏歌)".

Notes

References 

 Fang, Xuanling (ed.) (648). Book of Jin (Jin Shu).
 Liu, Yiqing (ed.) ( 5th century). A New Account of the Tales of the World (Shishuo Xinyu / Shiyu).
 Sima, Guang (1084). Zizhi Tongjian.

308 births
357 deaths
Jin dynasty (266–420) generals
Jin dynasty (266–420) poets